Devils Well Hollow is a valley in Shannon County in the U.S. state of Missouri.

Devils Well Hollow was so named on account of a deep hole in the valley from which spring water could be obtained.

References

Valleys of Shannon County, Missouri
Valleys of Missouri